The Barchester Chronicles is a 1982 British television serial produced by Jonathan Powell for the BBC. It is an adaptation by Alan Plater of Anthony Trollope's first two Chronicles of Barsetshire, The Warden (1855) and Barchester Towers (1857). The series was directed by David Giles. Location work was videotaped in and around Peterborough Cathedral, using locations such as the Deanery and Laurel Court.

Plot overview
The clerical community around Barchester's cathedral is rocked by a press investigation into the finances of Hiram's Hospital almshouse. Following the death of the bishop in the midst of the controversy, the chaplain and wife of the new bishop lead a reforming crusade, which arouses strong opposition within the diocese. These public events have a significant effect on the private lives of many of those involved.

Cast

 Donald Pleasence as Mr Harding
 Nigel Hawthorne as Archdeacon Grantly
 Angela Pleasence as Mrs Grantly
 Cyril Luckham as Bishop Grantly
 David Gwillim as John Bold
 George Costigan as Tom Towers
 John Ringham as Finney
 Barbara Flynn as Mary Bold
 Janet Maw as Eleanor Harding
 Clive Swift as Bishop Proudie
 Geraldine McEwan as Mrs Proudie
 Alan Rickman as Obadiah Slope
 Susan Hampshire as Signora Madeline Neroni
 Ursula Howells as Miss Thorne
 Peter Blythe as Bertie Stanhope
 Susan Edmonstone as Charlotte Stanhope
 Joseph O'Conor as Bunce
 Jonathan Adams as Mr Quiverful
 Maggie Jones as Mrs Quiverful
 Clifford Parrish as Handy
 Derek New as Mr Arabin
 Richard Bebb as Dr Stanhope
 William Redgrave as Samuel Grantly
 Trevor Baxter as Dr. Gwynne
 George Costigan as Tom Towers
 Wally Thomas as Moody
 Kenneth Keeling as Gazy 
 Denis Carey as Skulpit
 Richard Leech as Wilfred Thorne
 George Malpas as the ticket collector
 Mischa De La Motte as The Dean
 Raymond Platt as Haphazard's clerk
 Alec Bregonzi as a Footman
 Paddy Ward as Hotel Waiter
 Roger Booth as Plomacy
 Joe Ritchie as Coffee House Waiter
 Michael Aldridge as Sir Abraham Haphazard
 Phyllida Law as Mrs. Stanhope
 Ian Brimble as Harry Greenacre
 Keith Marsh as Bell
 Jim Baker as Quiverfull child
 Harold Gasnier as Form Tutor

Filming locations

Peterborough Cathedral
Chavenage House, Tetbury, Gloucestershire
Abbots Gate, Peterborough Cathedral
The Deanery, Gravel Walk, Peterborough Cathedral
Laurel Court, Vineyard Road, Peterborough

Awards
The series won a BAFTA award for Design (Chris Pemsel) in 1982, also being nominated for Drama Series/Serial (Jonathan Powell, David Giles), Costume Design (Juanita Waterson), Graphics (Stewart Austin), Make Up (Elizabeth Rowell), Sound Supervisor (Chick Anthony), Video Cameraman (Geoff Feld), and Video Lighting (Howard King).

References

External links
 

BBC television dramas
Period television series
Television shows based on British novels
1982 British television series debuts
1982 British television series endings
1980s British drama television series
1980s British television miniseries
English-language television shows